Mṛgaśiraṣa (also spelled Mārgaśīrṣa/Mṛgaśira; Devanagari: मृगशीर्ष) is the 5th nakṣatra or lunar mansion as used in Hindu astronomy and astrology in the constellation Orion. Its position is described in the Surya Siddhānta.

The asterism’s names in various languages are:
 
Sinhalese:Muwasirasa

The first two carana/pada (quarters) of this nakṣatra are part of Vṛṣabha Rāśi (Devanagari: वृषभ) or Taurus. The latter half of this star belong to Mithuna Rāśi (Devanagari: मिथुन) or Gemini (from 23°20’ Taurus to 6°40’ Gemini). stars in λ, φ1, φ2 Orionis

Etymology
The term Mṛgaśira (मृगशिर) a composite of two Sanskrit words, mṛga (मृग) meaning deer and śira (शिर) meaning head or precisely, the top of the head.

The names Mṛgaśira (मृगशिर) and Mārgaśīrṣa/Mṛgaśīrṣa (मार्गशीर्ष) are sometimes used interchangeably. 
Grammatically, Mārgaśīrṣa (मार्गशीर्ष) means "of Mṛgaśira" or "related to Mṛgaśira". Thus Mṛgaśira (मृगशिर) is the correct name of the star, while Mārgaśīrṣa (मार्गशीर्ष) is the name of the month related to Mṛgaśira, i.e., the month in which moon will be in conjuncture with the Mṛgaśira nakṣatra. In Malayalam it is called Makayeeram.

Naming principles
Under the traditional Hindu principle of naming individuals according to their Moon/Chandra nakshatra, the following Sanskrit syllables correspond with this nakṣatra, and would belong at the beginning of a first name:

Ve (Devanagari: वे)
Vo (Devanagari: वो)
Ka (Devanagari: क)
Ki (Devanagari: कि)

Mṛgaśira nakṣatra extends from after 23°20 in Vṛṣabha Rāśi up to 6°40 in Mithuna. Star is governed by mars and the presiding deity or God is a Soma God. Soma mean Chandra or Moon God. He holds  amrita (nectar of immortality ). Symbol is Antelope or Deer. Rules the following parts of the body :  face, chin, cheeks, larynx, palate, throat, vocal chord, arms, shoulders, thymus gland, upper ribs.

The word mṛga represents forests, gardens, a search, a seeking to find, to roam about in forests and a hunter, to seek to blaze the trail, a guide and preceptor. Mṛgaśirṣa is partly in Vṛṣabha and partly in Mithuna. It conveys the ideas of searching for beautiful faces, visit or request a girl in marriage. People born in this nakṣatra have a strong body and moderate complexion.

See also
List of Nakshatras

References

Nakshatra